Francis John Davis, CMG, OBE (13 April 1900 – 28 February 1980) was an Australian politician. Born in Melbourne, he attended state schools before becoming a meat industry executive. A founding member of the Liberal Party, he was elected to the Australian House of Representatives in 1949 as the Liberal member for Deakin, succeeding William Hutchinson. He held the seat until his retirement in 1966. He later became Chairman of the Commonwealth Serum Laboratories. Davis died in 1980.

References

Liberal Party of Australia members of the Parliament of Australia
Members of the Australian House of Representatives for Deakin
Members of the Australian House of Representatives
Australian Companions of the Order of St Michael and St George
Australian Officers of the Order of the British Empire
1900 births
1980 deaths
20th-century Australian politicians